Martin Stašek (born 8 April 1989 in Zlín) is a Czech athlete competing primarily in the shot put. He represented his country at the 2013 World Championships finishing twelfth in the final.

His personal best in the event is 20.98 metres, set in 2013.

Competition record

Personal bests
Outdoor
Shot put – 20.98 (Chodov 2013)
Discus throw – 57.42 (2012)
Indoor
Shot put – 20.73 (Prague 2013)

References

1989 births
Living people
Czech male shot putters
Sportspeople from Zlín
Competitors at the 2011 Summer Universiade
Competitors at the 2013 Summer Universiade